Baljit Singh (born 23 August 1983) is an Italian cricketer who plays for the national team. In May 2019, he was named in Italy's squad for their Twenty20 International (T20I) series against Germany in the Netherlands. He made his T20I debut for Italy against Germany on 25 May 2019. The same month, he was named in Italy's squad for the Regional Finals of the 2018–19 ICC T20 World Cup Europe Qualifier tournament in Guernsey. He played in Italy's opening match of the Regional Finals, against Norway, on 15 June 2019. He finished the tournament as the joint-leading wicket-taker, with ten dismissals.

In September 2021, he was named in Italy's T20I squad for the Regional Final of the 2021 ICC Men's T20 World Cup Europe Qualifier tournament.
His family lived in village raipur pir bux wala, kapurthala. He was famous for cricket from his childhood. His father sardar Jasveer singh was a farmer. He has four brothers .

References

External links
 

1983 births
Living people
Italian cricketers
Italy Twenty20 International cricketers
Place of birth missing (living people)